The 2012 International Bernese Ladies Cup was held from January 13 to 15 at the Curlingbahn Allmend in Bern, Switzerland as part of the 2011–12 World Curling Tour. The winning team of Michèle Jäggi took home the event purse of CHF20,000. The event was held in a triple-knockout format.

For the first time, a spot in the Cup was awarded to the winner of the 2011 Curl Atlantic Championship, Suzanne Birt of Prince Edward Island, Canada.

Teams

Knockout results

A event

B event

C event

Consolation Event

Consolation Cup

Playoffs

References

External links

International Bernese Ladies Cup
International Bernese Ladies Cup
Women's curling competitions in Switzerland
International sports competitions hosted by Switzerland